The USS Duncan (FFG-10) was the fourth ship of the Oliver Hazard Perry-class of guided-missile frigates, and was named for Vice Admiral Donald B. Duncan (1896–1975).  Ordered from Todd Pacific, Seattle, Washington on 27 February 1976 as part of the FY75 program, Duncan was laid down on 29 April 1977, launched on 1 March 1978, and commissioned on 15 May 1980, CDR Ross D. Barker in command.

History
Duncan, former PF-111, was sponsored by Mrs. Aniela Mateja Duncan, widow of the ship's namesake.

In December 1982, Duncan developed a  fissure in her superstructure during a storm. It was a class design deficiency that occurred on other frigates.

In January 1984, Duncan was transferred to the United States Navy Reserve Fleet and Selected Reserve (SELRES) members provided for a portion of the ship's manning.

Duncan and her crew were awarded the Battle Effectiveness Award five times for 18-month time periods ranging from July 1981 to June 1983 and July 1986 to December 1990.

Duncan participated in Port of Hueneme Harbor Days in October 1992.

In March 1993, sailors aboard Duncan rescued four fisherman from Ecuador who were stranded on their disabled fishing boat in the Pacific Ocean. Duncan towed their boat to safety in Manta, Ecuador. Duncan and her crew were nominated for the Humanitarian Service Medal in March 1993, but no unit award was given.

1992 Sitka port visit
Duncan participated in Sitka, Alaska's 125th anniversary Alaska Day celebration, 18 October 1992. The port visit became notorious following allegations of sexual misconduct with minors by crew members and the event's relative proximity to the Tailhook scandal and subsequent investigation. After Duncan was decommissioned, the story re-appeared in national media in 1996, following investigative reporting by the Dayton Daily News' Russell Carollo, due to complaints that the Navy didn't adequately punish the sailors involved. A grand jury in Sitka indicted two Duncan sailors on sexual assault charges, but the cases were dismissed in January 1997 due to prosecutorial delay and the Judge's determination that the two had already been tried by the Navy. A 22-year-old Ensign had faced court martial, but pleaded down to a letter of reprimand. Later, he also received an other than honorable discharge. The second sailor, a 23-year-old enlisted man, also faced court martial, but his charges were dropped by the court's presiding officer.

Decommissioning
Duncan was decommissioned on 17 December 1994 and stricken on 5 January 1998, Duncan was sold to Turkey on 5 April 1999 for use as a parts hulk. She was the first Perry-class frigate to be decommissioned, in commission for just 14.6 years. At the time, the Soviet Union had recently collapsed and Duncan was one of the oldest, unmodified, short hulled frigates in the fleet. She lacked some of the options others in her class had been modified with. For example, as a short hull ship, she did not have SH-60 Seahawk capability and a RAST to haul down the helicopter and transport it into the hangar. She also lacked a towed array sonar (TACTAS) and the MK-92 COherent Receiver Transmitter (CORT) modification. On 4 October 2017, ex-Duncan was scuttled by the submarine TCG Sakarya on the Black Sea.

See also
Gölcük Naval Base - location of several of the ex-USN Oliver Hazard Perry-class frigates in service with Turkey and one mast-less hulk, possibly ex-Duncan.

References

External links

Navsource.org - FFG-10
MaritimeQuest USS Duncan FFG-10 pages

 

1978 ships
Ships built in Seattle
Oliver Hazard Perry-class frigates of the United States Navy
Ships sunk as targets
Shipwrecks in the Black Sea